Charles Adamson is the name of:

Charles Adamson (sculptor) (1880–1959), Scottish-Canadian sculptor
 Charles Lodge Adamson (1906–1979), English cricketer
Chuck Adamson (ice hockey) (born 1938), former professional ice hockey goaltender.
 Charlie Adamson (1875–1918), English rugby union player
 Chuck Adamson (1936–2008), police officer turned screenwriter

See also
Adamson (surname)